Silver Knight may refer to:

Silver Knight (horse), a thoroughbred racehorse from New Zealand
Silver Knight Awards, an awards program recognizing student achievement in South Florida
Silver Knights (video game), a mech action/fighting game
Henderson Silver Knights, a hockey team based in Henderson, NV
Syracuse Silver Knights, an indoor soccer team based in Syracuse, NY
Silver Knight, a character in .hack